Joshua P. Bryant is an American politician. He serves as a Republican member for the 32nd district of the Arkansas Senate. He also served as a member for the 96th district of the Arkansas House of Representatives.

Life and career 
Bryant was a justice of the peace in Benton County, Arkansas.

In 2021, Bryant was elected to represent the 96th district of the Arkansas House of Representatives, succeeding Jill Bryant. He served until 2022, when he sought election to the Arkansas Senate. Longtime senator Cecile Bledsoe retired from the 3rd district, which had been renumbered to the 32nd district during redistricting.

In May 2022, Bryant defeated Jim Tull in the Republican primary election for the 32nd district of the Arkansas Senate. No candidate was nominated to challenge him in the general election. He was seated January 9, 2023 in the 94th Arkansas General Assembly.

References 

Living people
Place of birth missing (living people)
Year of birth missing (living people)
Republican Party members of the Arkansas House of Representatives
Republican Party Arkansas state senators
21st-century American politicians